William John Abbott "Dave" Davies OBE (21 June 1890 – 26 April 1967) was a Welsh rugby union footballer who played international rugby for England normally positioned at fly-half. He also captained his country.

Career
Davies was born in Pembroke, Wales, and originally played for Pembroke Dock Harlequins. Davies made his international debut on 4 January 1913  at Twickenham in the England vs South Africa match. He was part of the England team that won the Grand Slam in both 1921 and 1923. During his time playing he earned 22 caps, making him England's most capped fly-half until Rob Andrew overtook him. He played half of his matches as captain. During his 22 matches at international level, he was on a losing side only in the first, against South Africa in 1913. He formed a notable international half-back partnership with his Royal Navy team-mate Cecil Kershaw; in their 14 matches together for England they never finished on the losing side.

Personal life
Outside of rugby, Davies served as a naval officer aboard HMS Iron Duke and HMS Queen Elizabeth during World War I, for which he was appointed an OBE in 1919. Davies also was offered the chance to play at Wimbledon, but declined the offer to focus on his rugby. Davies had two children.

References

WJA Davies inducted into RFU Hall of Fame (PDF Format)
1913-1919 Great Sport Stories

1890 births
1967 deaths
England international rugby union players
Officers of the Order of the British Empire
Royal Navy officers of World War I
Royal Navy rugby union players
Rugby union fly-halves
Rugby union players from Pembroke
Welsh rugby union players